The Tourism Association of Koh Samui is a tourism organisation on Ko Samui, Thailand.  Founded in 1987, it is a non-profit organisation composed of over 50 members including travel professionals, restaurants, hotels and resorts, and retail businesses.  Its purpose is promoting Ko Samui as a travel destination and in advocacy on behalf of tourism interests in the region.

Activities
In 2012, the Ko Samui Tourism Association coordinated with Bangkok Airways and the Athletic Association of Thailand to promote the Samui Island Marathon, known as the Samui Island Marathon HRH Maha Chakri Sirindhorn Princess Cup 2012.
Studying and forecasting tourism statistics and markets and planning marketing campaigns.
taking part in promotional campaigns, such as a joint "road show" with Bangkok Airways and the Tourism Authority of Thailand (TAT) in 2012 to promote new direct air service to and from Kuala Lumpur.
joining with other organizations to oppose oil drilling in the Gulf of Thailand, which will endanger Ko Samui's tourism industry and market appeal.  The association is a supporter of the Rak Aao Thai Network Group, an alliance formed to fight the oil drilling.  Other groups supporting the network include the Spa Association of Koh Samui, t Koh Samui Municipality, Suratthani Rajabhat University, the Thai Hotel Association's local region, and the Surat Thani Trade and Commerce Association, and various environmental and conservation groups.

See also
Tourism in Thailand

References

Organizations established in 1987
Tourism in Thailand
Environmental issues in Thailand
Non-profit organizations based in Thailand
Tourism agencies